Marshal of the Soviet Union was the highest military rank of the Soviet Union.

The rank of Marshal of the Soviet Union was created in 1935 and abolished in 1991 when the Soviet Union dissolved. Forty-one people held this rank. The equivalent naval rank was until 1955 admiral of the fleet and from 1955 Admiral of the Fleet of the Soviet Union.

While the supreme rank of Generalissimus of the Soviet Union, which would have been senior to Marshal of the Soviet Union, was proposed for Joseph Stalin after the Second World War, it was never officially approved.

History of the rank

The military rank of Marshal of the Soviet Union was established by a decree of the Soviet Cabinet, the Council of People's Commissars (Sovnarkom), on 22 September 1935. On 20 November, the rank was conferred on five people: People's Commissar of Defence and veteran Bolshevik Kliment Voroshilov, Chief of the General Staff of the Red Army Alexander Yegorov, and three senior commanders, Vasily Blyukher, Semyon Budyonny, and Mikhail Tukhachevsky.

Of these, Blyukher, Tukhachevsky, and Yegorov were executed during Stalin's Great Purge of 1937–38. On 7 May 1940, three new Marshals were appointed: the new People's Commissar of Defence, Semyon Timoshenko, Boris Shaposhnikov, and Grigory Kulik.

During World War II, Kulik was demoted for incompetence, and the rank of Marshal of the Soviet Union was given to a number of military commanders who earned it on merit. These included Georgy Zhukov, Ivan Konev and Konstantin Rokossovsky to name a few. In 1943, Stalin himself was made a Marshal of the Soviet Union, and in 1945, he was joined by his intelligence and police chief Lavrenti Beria. These non-military Marshals were joined in 1947 by politician Nikolai Bulganin.

Two Marshals were executed in postwar purges: Kulik in 1950 and Beria in 1953, following Stalin's death. Thereafter the rank was awarded only to professional soldiers, with the exception of Leonid Brezhnev, who made himself a Marshal in 1976, and Dmitry Ustinov, who was prominent in the arms industry and was appointed Defence Minister in July 1976. The last Marshal of the Soviet Union was Dmitry Yazov, appointed in 1990, who was imprisoned after the failed coup against Mikhail Gorbachev in 1991. Marshal Sergei Akhromeev committed suicide in 1991 during the fall of the Soviet Union.

The Marshals fell into three generational groups.

 Those who had gained their reputations during the Russian Civil War. These included both those who were purged in 1937–38 (Blyukher, Tukhachevsky, and Yegorov), and those who held high commands in the early years of World War II (Budyonny, Kulik, Shaposhnikov, Timoshenko and Voroshilov). All of the latter except Shaposhnikov and Timoshenko proved out-of-step with modern warfare and were removed from commanding positions.
 Those who made their reputations in World War II and assumed high commands in the latter part of the war. These included Zhukov, Vasilievsky, Konev, Rokossovsky, Malinovsky, Tolbukhin, Govorov, and Meretskov.
 Those who assumed high command in the Cold War era. All of these were officers in World War II, but their higher commands were held in the Warsaw Pact or as Soviet Defence Ministers. These included Sokolovsky, Grechko, Yakubovsky, Kulikov, Ogarkov, Akhromeev, and Yazov.

All Marshals in the third category had been officers in World War II, except Ustinov, who had been People's Commissar for Armaments. Even Yazov, who was 20 when the war ended, had been a platoon commander. Brezhnev was not a professional soldier, but was still commissioned as a political commissar in the war.

Of the 35 Marshals who were career soldiers, the majority were of Russian origin. Timoshenko (Tymoshenko), Kulik (Kulyk), Grechko (Hrechko), Yeremenko (Yeryomenko), Moskalenko, Batitsky (Batytsʹkyy) and Koshevoy (Koshovyy) were of Ukrainian origin, while Sokolovsky (Sakaloŭski) and Yakubovsky (Jakuboŭski) had Belarusian origins. Rokossovsky (Rokossowski) was born in Congress Poland to a Polish family, while Malinovsky (Malinowsky) was born in Odessa (now in Ukraine) to a Polish father. Tukhachevsky also had Polish ancestry. Bagramyan (Baghramyan) was the sole marshal of Armenian origin.

The rank was abolished with the dissolution of the Soviet Union in December 1991. It was succeeded in the new Russia by the rank of Marshal of the Russian Federation, which has been held by only one person, Marshal Igor Sergeyev, who was Russian Defence Minister from 1997 to 2001.

After the death of Marshal Yazov in 2020 there were no living Marshals of the Soviet Union.

List of Marshals of the Soviet Union

Timeline

See also
Generalissimus of the Soviet Union
Admiral of the fleet of the Soviet Union
Marshal of the Russian Federation
History of Russian military ranks
Military ranks of the Soviet Union
Marshal of the branch
Chief marshal of the branch
Field Marshal of Imperial Russia
Marshal of the People's Republic of China
Ranks and insignia of the Red Army and Navy 1935–1940, and 1940–1943
Ranks and rank insignia of the Soviet Armed Forces 1943–1955, and 1955–1991

Notes

References

External links 
Biographies of all the Marshals of the USSR

 
Military ranks of the Soviet Union